A Walk on the Moon is a 1999 drama film starring Diane Lane, Viggo Mortensen, Liev Schreiber and Anna Paquin. The film, which was set against the backdrop of the Woodstock festival of 1969 and the United States's Moon landing of that year, was distributed by Miramax Films. Directed by Tony Goldwyn in his directorial debut, the fim was acclaimed on release. Diane Lane earned an Independent Spirit Award nomination for Best Female Lead for her performance.

Plot 
Pearl Kantrowitz and her husband Marty are a lower middle class Jewish couple in New York City. For the summer of 1969, the couple go on their annual vacation at Dr. Fogler's Bungalows in the Catskills with their family, which includes teenage daughter Alison, young son Danny, and Marty's mother Lillian.

Marty, who works as a television repairman back in the city, can only visit his family at the camp on the weekends. Pearl, who got pregnant with Alison at the age of 17 and quickly married Marty, feels at a crossroads in her life. She meets Walker Jerome, a free-spirited salesman who goes from resort to resort selling clothes. With Marty absent, Pearl starts spending more time with Walker and they begin an affair. 

Meanwhile, Alison undergoes her own summer of changes and experiences teenage rites of passage—her first period, her first date, and her first kiss with Ross Epstein, a boy at the camp.

The impending Moon landing has kept Marty busy at his job, as customers are anxious to have their TV sets ready for the historic event. While the whole town celebrates Neil Armstrong's first steps on the moon, Pearl and Walker have sex. Marty's mother Lillian learns of the affair and tries to persuade Pearl to break it off. But the affair continues when Marty cannot visit on the weekend because of the traffic jams caused by the huge Woodstock festival, which is taking place within walking distance of the bungalow colony. 

Pearl goes to the festival with Walker. Alison goes to the festival as well with her friends, although her mother had explicitly forbidden her to do so. When Alison happens to see Pearl in the festival crowds carousing with Walker while on LSD, she becomes upset and leaves with Ross.

Marty learns of his wife's affair and confronts Pearl. Alison also confronts her mother in an emotional scene. Pearl is forced to deal with her love of her family and her conflicting yearning for marital freedom.

Pearl decides to stay with Marty and tells Walker she can’t go away with him. Walker says he understands. The final scene shows Pearl and Marty dancing together, first to Dean Martin's "When You're Smiling" and then to Jimi Hendrix's "Purple Haze", after Marty changes the radio station.

Cast 

 Diane Lane as Pearl Kantrowitz
 Viggo Mortensen as Walker Jerome
 Liev Schreiber as Marty Kantrowitz
 Anna Paquin as Allison Kantrowitz
 Tovah Feldshuh as Lillian Kantrowitz
 Bobby Boriello as Danny Kantrowitz
 Julie Kavner as P.A. Announcer
 Mahée Paiement as Mrs. Dymbort
 Star Jasper as Rhoda Leiberman
 Ellen David as Eleanor Gelfand
 Lisa Bronwyn Moore as Norma Fogler
 Lisa Jakub as Myra Naidell
 Joseph Perrino as Ross Epstein
 Stewart Bick as Neil Leiberman

Production

Development 
Playwright Pamela Gray, inspired by her own experiences vacationing with her family in a Catskills bungalow colony as a youth, first wrote the script in 1992. Gray said, "I remember sitting by the pool in Dr. Locker’s bungalow colony and watching the hippies walk by on the way to Woodstock. And it was this time warp. We’ve got women playing mah-jongg and canasta and the guys are playing pinochle. We are this little ‘50s enclave, and everything outside was in the 1960s." The script was originally titled "The Blouse Man" and won the national Samuel Goldwyn Writing Award. 

Gray was unsuccessful in getting the script produced, as financiers told her the story was "too small, too soft, not universal, and too Jewish." Years later, actor Tony Goldwyn, the grandson of Samuel Goldwyn, came across the script by coincidence and was immediately drawn to the story's themes of midlife identity crises and coming-of-age against the backdrop of the 1960s counterculture. Said Goldwyn, ''You suddenly see your life laid out in front of you. And you say, 'Is this the life I dreamed of having? Am I the person I wanted to become?' If the answer's no, that's a very scary moment. And sometimes what it takes to deal with that is very risky: it requires shattering the status quo."

Goldwyn originally intended to only produce, but after not finding a director who shared his passion for the story, decided to direct the film himself.

Filming 
The film was shot in the Laurentian Mountains in eastern Canada over a period of 36 days in the summer of 1997. Liev Schreiber based his character Marty on his own grandfather.

Soundtrack

The soundtrack for the film was released March 23, 1999 through Sire Records. It contains sixteen tracks.

Release 
Before its release, the film secured distribution from Miramax. It was first shown at the 1999 Sundance Film Festival, where an enthusiastic reception convinced Miramax to release the film theatrically that spring.

A Walk on the Moon went into limited release on March 26, 1999, and expanded nationwide through the month of April. Its worldwide box office total was $4,750,660.

Critical reception 
A Walk on the Moon received positive reviews among critics. Rotten Tomatoes gives the film an approval rating of 72% based on 36 reviews, with an average rating of 6.9/10. The site's consensus states: "An impressive showcase for Diane Lane and an assured debut from director Tony Goldwyn, A Walk on the Moon finds absorbing period drama within a family at a crossroads." Metacritic assigned the film a weighted average score of 70 out of 100, based on 22 critics, indicating "generally favorable reviews".

Michael Wilmington of the Chicago Tribune wrote that the film "becomes something larger and deeper as we watch" and that the character of Allison is an obvious surrogate for screenwriter Pamela Gray. He added that what makes A Walk in the Moon interesting is its refusal to take sides or villainize any one person given that it "is about that old '60s polarity -- the hip and the square, the trapped and the free." Stephen Hunter of The Washington Post praised Diane Lane's "capacity to express the yearning that Pearl feels as authentically as the guilt she suffers." He also described Marty as a "schlumph". Janet Maslin of The New York Times wrote, "Even when it turns turbulent, the film sustains its warm summer glow, and makes itself a conversation piece about the moral issues it means to raise."

Ty Burr of Entertainment Weekly gave a more mixed review and criticized the film's ending, but noted "'A Walk on the Moon' still nails the cultural crosscurrents of 1969 — the way that a woman who has been walking the straight and narrow for years could suddenly give in to all the freedom rushing by around her."  

Desson Howe, also of the Washington Post, found the film "a little too perfect and symbolically signposted for its own good". Roger Ebert gave a mixed review but singled out Anna Paquin’s performance, saying her plot line “as a teenage girl struggling with new ideas and raging hormones” is the film’s most compelling story.
 
Readers of Entertainment Weekly ranked the film as #9 on the magazine's "50 Sexiest Movies Ever" poll in 2008.

Accolades

Musical adaptation 
Pamela Gray adapted her script into a stage musical, with music and lyrics by Paul Scott Goodman and AnnMarie Milazzo. The musical was first staged by the American Conservatory Theater in San Francisco in June 2018. The musical was set to debut at the George Street Playhouse in New Jersey in 2020 but was delayed due to COVID-19 restrictions. The play ultimately opened on April 26, 2022 presented by the George Street Playhouse.

References

External links 

 
 
 
 

1999 films
1999 directorial debut films
1999 independent films
1999 romantic drama films
American romantic drama films
Films about Jews and Judaism
Films directed by Tony Goldwyn
Films scored by Mason Daring
Films set in 1969
Films set in New York (state)
Films shot in Montreal
Miramax films
Village Roadshow Pictures films
Woodstock Festival
1990s English-language films
1990s American films
Films about mother–daughter relationships
Films about puberty
Adultery in films